The Laurel Highlands is a region in southwestern Pennsylvania made up of Fayette County, Somerset County, and Westmoreland County. It has a population of about 600,000 people.

The region is approximately fifty-five miles southeast of Pittsburgh; the Laurel Highlands center on Laurel Hill and Chestnut Ridge of the Allegheny Mountains. Because of the elevation, weather in the Laurel Highlands is generally cooler and wetter than in most other parts of the state.

The Laurel Highlands are a popular area for camping, hiking, mountain biking, hunting, whitewater kayaking, trout fishing, wildlife viewing, and downhill (and cross-country) skiing, and golf.

Amusement parks and resorts

Hidden Valley Resort
Idlewild Park and Soak Zone
Nemacolin Woodlands
Polymath Park
Seven Springs Mountain Resort
Laurel Mountain
Summit Inn Resort

Architecture
Fallingwater
Kentuck Knob
Polymath Park

National parks and historic sites

National Parks
 Allegheny Portage Railroad
 Flight 93 National Memorial
Fort Necessity
Friendship Hill
Johnstown Flood National Memorial
UNESCO World Heritage Site
Fallingwater

Historic Sites

Bowman%27s Castle
Bushy Run Battlefield
Compass Inn
Fort Ligonier
Hannastown, Pennsylvania
Heritage Discovery Center
Johnstown Flood Museum
Johnstown Inclined Plane
National Road
 Quecreek Mine Rescue
 Route of the Lincoln Highway
Somerset County Courthouse
Somerset Historical Center
Staple Bend Tunnel
Uptown Somerset Historic District
Wagner–Ritter House & Garden
West Overton, Pennsylvania

Parks and outdoor recreation

State Parks and Forests
Forbes State Forest
Gallitzin State Forest
Keystone State Park
Kooser State Park
Laurel Hill State Park
Laurel Mountain State Park
Laurel Ridge State Park
Laurel Summit State Park
Linn Run State Park
Mount Davis (part of Forbes State Forest)
Ohiopyle State Park
Prince Gallitzin State Park
Youghiogheny River

Trails
Coal and Coke Trail
Ghost Town Trail
Great Allegheny Passage
Laurel Highlands Hiking Trail (part of Laurel Ridge State Park)
Jim Mayer Riverwalk
Westmoreland Heritage Trail
Five Star Trail

Downhill ski areas
Hidden Valley Resort
Laurel Mountain Ski Resort
 Seven Springs Mountain Resort

References

External links
 

 
Allegheny Mountains
Pittsburgh metropolitan area
Regions of Pennsylvania
Highlands